I Killed the Prom Queen were an Australian metalcore band from Adelaide, formed in 2000. They were prominent in the Australian live music scene and toured the US, Japan and parts of Europe several times. They issued three studio albums: When Goodbye Means Forever... (2003), Music for the Recently Deceased (2006) – the latter reached the top 30 on the ARIA Albums Chart, and most recently Beloved (2014). The band split up in April 2007 due to the inability to find a permanent vocalist. They reformed with vocalist Michael Crafter to play a farewell tour in mid-2008 and released a live album and DVD, Sleepless Nights and City Lights, which peaked in the top 50. In May 2011 the band reformed with new vocalist Jamie Hope and performed on the Destroy Music Tour. They subsequently released their third studio album Beloved in February 2014.

History

Formation and Choose to Love, Live or Die, Stacy's departure (2000–2002)
I Killed the Prom Queen formed in Adelaide, South Australia in late 2000, with the original line-up featuring Ben Engel on bass guitar, Simon O'Gorman on guitar, JJ Peters (Josef John W. Peters) on drums, Lee Stacy on vocals and Jona Weinhofen on guitar. Peters, Weinhofen and bass guitarist Leaton Rose had previously been members of the local band Cur. In early 2000 Weinhofen left Cur to form The Fall of Troy with vocalist Michael Crafter, before later forming I Killed the Prom Queen. Originally named The Rubik's Equation, then briefly Child Left Burning, the band's first performance was at the Reynella Youth Enterprise Centre in late 2001. The following year, Crafter joined to share lead vocals and soon after Rose replaced Engel on bass guitar.

The band was influenced by late 1990s hardcore bands Poison the Well, Converge, Hatebreed, and Earth Crisis and Swedish melodic death metal groups like At the Gates, Soilwork and In Flames. In late 2001 and early 2002, the group recorded the four-track Choose to Love, Live or Die EP, which was produced by Paul Degasperi and the band; with additional guitar supplied by Cain Kapetanakis. Five songs were recorded during the sessions, but a computer glitch caused the fifth to be erased. In 2002, it was issued by 618 Recordings, then re-released by Final Prayer Records and distributed by Missing Link Records. Following the release O'Gorman left to join Day of Contempt and he was replaced by guitarist Kevin Cameron in late 2002. Choose to Love, Live or Die was the only release to include both Lee Stacey's vocals and the higher-pitched vocals by Crafter, as Stacy would depart from the band later that year. The tracks were later re-recorded for their third EP, Your Past Comes Back to Haunt You (2005).

Split CD with Parkway Drive and When Goodbye Means Forever (2003–2005)
In March 2003, Rose departed (he later joined The Hot Lies) and Sean Kennedy took his place. The new lineup then recorded the "Homicide" demo, which appeared on Blunt Magazine's Harder Core than You compilation. While in Byron Bay Crafter saw the first performance by local metalcore band Parkway Drive and was so impressed that he invited the group to record a split CD with his band. In May, Final Prayer Records issued the I Killed the Prom Queen / Parkway Drive split EP, with two tracks by I Killed the Prom Queen ("Homicide Documentaries" and "Death Certificate for a Beauty Queen") and two by Parkway Drive.

In September, the line-up of Cameron, Crafter, Kennedy, Peters and Weinhofen recorded their debut studio album When Goodbye Means Forever... for Sydney hardcore label Resist Records, which was released in December. It was produced by Dan Jones, Anj and the group. In early 2004, they toured Australia with Evergreen Terrace, Give Up the Ghost, and Boysetsfire. The album was released in the US by Eulogy Recordings in March, and extensive US touring followed. Crafter said that when entering Hawaii, "Three of us got questioned. They were asking us what jails we had been in, what our parents did and what our parents thought of our tattoos".

The band spent the coming months supporting Caliban, Evergreen Terrace, It Dies Today, Lamb of God, Silverstein, Bleeding Through, The Red Chord, Fear Before the March of Flames, Until the End, The Warriors, Between the Buried and Me, and On Broken Wings over four months. On March 7, 2005 the band released their third EP, Your Past Comes Back to Haunt You. The recording featured reworked versions of the band's older songs and "To Be Sleeping While Still Standing". The latter track was written by The Fall of Troy (not to be confused with the US band of the same name), an earlier band including Crafter and Weinhofen, which only played two shows before breaking up.

Music for the Recently Deceased (2005–2007)
In August 2005, I Killed the Prom Queen flew to Sweden to record their follow-up album, Music for the Recently Deceased. By late 2005, they had completed recording the album but in January 2006 Crafter was fired. Instead of releasing the album as it was, they decided to recruit a new vocalist and replace Crafter's tracks. They recruited Ed Butcher from UK band The Hunt for Ida Wave. New lyrics were written by Cameron and Butcher, while some lyrics that the whole band had contributed during the Crafter sessions were retained. Music for the Recently Deceased was produced by Fredrik Nordström, whose other credits included Dimmu Borgir, Darkest Hour, At the Gates and In Flames, and by Patrik J Sten.

The album was released on 31 July 2006 by Stomp Entertainment and peaked in the top 30 on the ARIA Albums Chart. The Australian tour in support of the album had over 50 concert dates in three months, from north Western Australia to the southern states and then along the east coast to Cairns. They followed with a support slot on a tour for US groups Killswitch Engage and Lamb of God. The Sydney show brought 3,500 patrons to Luna Park, where I Killed the Prom Queen also played at the annual Come Together Music Festival. Shortly afterward Metal Blade released the album in the US, coinciding with the group's appearance at the New England Metal and Hardcore Festival. Returning to Australia after their third tour of the US in three years, the group toured with The Haunted and Exodus and in December, before headlining the Metal for the Brain festival.

Break-up and Say Goodbye Tour (2007–2008)

In January 2007 Butcher left the band, which the band attributed to homesickness. After returning to the UK, he fronted UK metalcore band Eternal Lord. Tyrone Ross from Mourning Tide temporarily filled the vocalist position for a Japanese tour. Colin Jeffs of Bendigo band Heavenslost then provided vocals on a European tour with Bleeding Through, All Shall Perish and Caliban.

In April, I Killed the Prom Queen announced their breakup, citing both an inability to find a permanent vocalist and Weinhofen's decision to join Bleeding Through. Shortly after a final Australian tour with Crafter on vocals was arranged for the following year. In May 2008, Stomp re-issued Music For The Recently Deceased in a limited tour edition – of 5,000 hand-numbered copies – for the Say Goodbye Tour. The release included a cardboard slipcase, two live tracks and four tracks with Crafter's vocals taken from the original album recording. The group toured in May and June, with most of the 18 shows selling out. The support acts were Bring Me the Horizon, The Red Shore, The Ghost Inside and local acts from each city. A live album and DVD, Sleepless Nights and City Lights, was recorded at their Adelaide performance; it was released on 22 November 2008 and peaked in the top 50. I Killed the Prom Queen played their supposed final show in Brisbane on 8 June 2008.

Hiatus (2008–2011) 
After the Say Goodbye tour Crafter formed Melbourne hardcore band Confession. He also previously did short stints as the vocalist for Carpathian and Bury Your Dead in 2006-2007 and 2007 respectively. He also appeared as a contestant on reality TV show Big Brother in 2008. Weinhofen departed Bleeding Through in 2009 and joined Bring Me the Horizon the same year. He acted as their rhythm guitarist, keyboardist, programmer and backing vocalist until January 2013. He also managed Australian deathcore act The Red Shore. 
Kevin Cameron formed the progressive metalcore band In Trenches with vocalist Ben Coyte. He also acted as a touring musician for several other groups. 
Peters formed and fronted hardcore project Deez Nuts and was one half of the hip-hop duo Grips & Tonic, alongside New Zealand rapper Louie Knuxx. 
Kennedy played bass for Deez Nuts on Australian and international tours.

Reformation and Beloved (2011–2017) 
In March 2011 I Killed the Prom Queen announced their reunion and an upcoming Australian tour in May with The Amity Affliction, Deez Nuts, and Of Mice & Men. Jamie Hope – later to be the vocalist of The Red Shore – joined the band as their new permanent vocalist. At the time, Weinhofen was not planning to leave Bring Me the Horizon and intended to remain in both groups. Likewise Peters continued his work with Deez Nuts.

In January 2012 Weinhofen confirmed that the band was writing their third studio album and said they were entering the studio at the end of the year with a tentative release date for the album in early 2013. However, in March 2013 the band announced on Facebook that the planned release date had been pushed back to early 2014.

The band played three UK dates in July. These three shows were around a similar time the band was planning to perform at the 2012 Sonisphere festival however, the festival was cancelled. After the cancellation, the band incorporated the UK shows into a 17-date European tour across eleven countries. Jona Weinhofen said touring in Europe was special for the band as they have a very strong fanbase there.

On 21 August 2012, I Killed the Prom Queen released new song "Memento Vivere" on YouTube. The accompanying live footage was taken from the recent European tour. The release was their first new song in six years, and the first song with Hope on vocals.

The band supported Parkway Drive on the Australian and New Zealand legs of the "Atlas Tour" in December 2012. In January 2013, Weinhofen departed Bring Me The Horizon, and shortly after his departure he confirmed that Prom Queen would become a full-time band.

On 24 March 2013 the band announced on Facebook that JJ Peters had left the band amicably to focus on his other project Deez Nuts. He was replaced by Shane O'Brien, formerly of Confession and Buried In Verona. This made Weinhofen the last remaining original member of the band, although Weinhofen and Cameron were the songwriters for every release since their debut EP.

I Killed the Prom Queen opened for Asking Alexandria on the "They Don't Pray for Us Tour" and Whitechapel on their short headline tour in America during spring 2013. This was the band's first time in the country in seven years. An extensive Australian tour was also announced, with Buried In Verona as the support act. The band also announced dates in Australia and Asia, described as reunion shows with Crafter fronting the band for half the tour and Butcher fronting for the second half, although this was just an April Fools' joke. The band were also due to play four summer dates in New Zealand alongside the Australian tour dates. However the New Zealand dates were cancelled eight days out from the opening show in Auckland. They then performed the Never Say Die tour throughout Europe and UK, headlined by Emmure.

In late July 2013 Sean Kennedy announced on his Instagram account that he was no longer a member of the band and would not be featured on the third album. Ben Coyte (ex-Day Of Contempt, Carpathian and current In Trenches vocalist) replaced Kennedy and played his first show with the band at Resurrection Fest 2013.
 
I Killed The Prom Queen announced that they had signed with Epitaph Records and that the new album Beloved would be released in Australia on 14 February 2014 and in the US on 18 February 2014. On 3 December 2013 they released the new single "To the Wolves". A music video for "Thirty One & Sevens" was released on 14 January, followed by a music video for "Bright Enough" on 22 July.

In 2014 Ben Coyte, Kevin Cameron and Jona Weinhofen gained a Lace Pick-ups endorsement.

The band played on the 2015 Vans Warped Tour for all dates.

In August 2017, in an Instagram comment to Weinhofen about the status of I Killed The Prom Queen, he said that playing guitar in a band isn't at the top of his priority list right now.

On 8 August 2018, the group announced they would be reuniting with their 'classic lineup' (featuring Crafter) for a one-off performance at the 2019 Unify Gathering festival, for the 15th anniversary of their debut album When Goodbye Means Forever.... However, two days later, Unify announced the band's appearance at the festival was cancelled due the unearthing of an "offensive" Facebook comment made two years prior by Crafter about gender equality in festival lineups. Crafter apologised for the comment and fans launched a petition to have the band re-added to the line-up, although Unify did not reverse the decision.

On February 26, 2021, the band shared a Facebook post from Weinhofen that announced the death of former bassist Sean Kennedy. Kennedy took his own life on February 24, 2021, at age 35.

Band members

Final lineup
 Jona Weinhofen – lead guitar, clean vocals, keyboards (2001–2007, 2008, 2011–2017)
 Kevin Cameron – rhythm guitar (2002–2007, 2008, 2011–2017)
 Jamie Hope – lead vocals (2011–2017)
 Benjamin Coyte – bass guitar, backing vocals (2013–2017)

Former members
 Lee Stacy – lead vocals (2001–2002)
 Simon O'Gorman – rhythm guitar, backing vocals (2001–2002)
 Ben Engel – bass (2001–2002)
 JJ Peters – drums (2001–2007, 2008, 2011–2013)
 Michael Crafter – lead vocals (2001–2006, 2008)
 Leaton Rose – bass (2002–2003)
 Sean Kennedy – bass (2003–2007, 2008, 2011–2013; died 2021)
 Ed Butcher – lead vocals (2006–2007)
 Shane O'Brien – drums (2013–2017)

Timeline

Discography

Studio albums

Live albums

Extended plays

Awards and nominations

AIR Awards
The Australian Independent Record Awards (commonly known informally as AIR Awards) is an annual awards night to recognise, promote and celebrate the success of Australia's Independent Music sector.

|-
| AIR Awards of 2009
|Sleepless Nights & City Lights 
| Best Independent Hard Rock/Punk Album
| 
|-

References

Australian metalcore musical groups
Musical groups from Adelaide
Musical groups established in 2000
Musical groups disestablished in 2007
Musical groups reestablished in 2011
Musical groups disestablished in 2017
2000 establishments in Australia
2017 disestablishments in Australia
Musical quintets
Eulogy Recordings artists